Richard George Lewington (born 13 April 1948) is a retired British diplomat. From 2011 to 2012 he worked as a border monitor with the EU Monitoring Mission in Georgia, based in the Field Office, Gori. He is a Trustee of the Dorset Expeditionary Society, a life member of the Society of Dorset Men, a member of Dorset Wildlife Trust, and since 2016 a member of the Battlefields Trust.

Lewington entered the Foreign Office in 1967, before that department was merged into the Foreign and Commonwealth Office the next year.  Over the next 39 years, after full-time Russian language training, he served around the world, mainly in Central Asia, the Mediterranean and the Andean region of South America. His assignments included Mongolia, Peru, the Soviet Union, Israel, and Yugoslavia, in addition to holding several positions in Whitehall.

In 1995, he was posted as Deputy High Commissioner to Malta. In 1999, he received his first posting as head of a diplomatic mission, as Ambassador to Kazakhstan and (non-resident) to the Kyrgyz Republic. In 2002, he left that position, before being posted to Ecuador the following year as Ambassador to Ecuador until his retirement from the Diplomatic Service at the end of 2006. From 2007 to 2009 he was Chief Technical Adviser for Tajikistan for the EU Border Management and Drug Action Programmes in Central Asia (BOMCA/CADAP) based in Dushanbe, Tajikistan. He is married with two adult children, and has a home in West Dorset. His hobbies include collecting old maps and books on Dorset and rambling.

References 

1948 births
Living people
Ambassadors of the United Kingdom to Ecuador
Ambassadors of the United Kingdom to Kazakhstan
Ambassadors of the United Kingdom to Kyrgyzstan